Edward Joseph Sicking (March 30, 1897 – August 30, 1978) was a  Major League Baseball infielder who played for five teams from  to . He appeared at second base, third base, and shortstop.

External links

 Interview with baseball player Eddie Sicking (sound recording) by Dr. Eugene Murdock on Mar. 12, 1974, in Cincinnati, Ohio (1 hr., 30 min.). Available on Cleveland Public Library's Digital Gallery.

1897 births
1978 deaths
New York Giants (NL) players
Chicago Cubs players
Philadelphia Phillies players
Cincinnati Reds players
Pittsburgh Pirates players
Baseball players from Ohio
Minor league baseball managers
Norfolk Tars players
San Antonio Bronchos players
Indianapolis Indians players
Louisville Colonels (minor league) players
Minneapolis Millers (baseball) players
Keokuk Indians players
People from Hamilton County, Ohio